Rautahat District, a part of Madhesh Province, is one of the seventy-seven districts of Nepal. The district headquarter is Gaur, including municipalities like Garuda, Chandrapur, Paroha, covers an area of 1,126 km2 and had a population of 545,132 in 2001 and 686,722 in 2011. This district has a total of 2 VDCs and 16 municipalities. Among other districts, Rautahat has the largest percent of Muslims in Nepal, about 19.7% (135,283 persons in 2011). The most Muslim densely Village Bairiya بيريا (in Rautahat district) is an example for secularism in Nepal. Sri Ram Sugar Mill is the only sugar mill located in Garuda municipality. The well known shiva temple located in Shivnagar, which is looked after by Sah and Jha family. The historical temple of Goddess Durga is in Matsari.Every year, the temple welcomes millions of devotees from different parts of Nepal and India as well on the occasion of Navaratri. Late Shri Gulab Narayan Jha, the first person to represent madhesis in politics, was permanent resident of this village.
There is a place called Najarpur in Chandrapur, Rautahat where whole village is vegetarian. They are not even allowed to buy or sell any alcoholic beverages and buying and selling of tobacco products is also prohibited.

Nunthar is a famous place for picnic and there is a temple of lord shiva which is located in Paurai Bagmati, Rautahat.

Rautahat district of Nepal is rich in natural resources. There are varieties of trees and varieties of medicinal herbs in the forest of Rautahat. There are dense forest with varieties of Wild Animals in the forest of Rautahat. The Animals include Cheetah, Tiger, Elephant, varieties of Snakes, etc. There are also varieties of birds in the forest of Rautahat. The bird includes Dove, hornbill, parrots, pigeons, cuckoo,sparrow,crow and many more.

Geography and Climate

The Manusmara River flows through the district, and feeds a canal for irrigating 3200 hectares of land.

Demographics
At the time of the 2011 Nepal census, Rautahat District had a population of 686,722. Of these, 60.3% spoke Bajjika, 19.3% Urdu, 6.1% Nepali, 4.3% Bhojpuri, 3.3% Tharu, 3.0% Maithili, 1.7% Tamang, 0.4% Magar, 0.2% Majhi, 0.2% Newar, 0.2% Rai, 0.1% Bengali, 0.1% Danuwar, 0.1% Doteli, 0.1% Hindi, 0.1% Yakkha and 0.1% other languages as their first language.

In terms of ethnicity/caste, 19.7% were Musalman, 12.2% Yadav, 5.7% Kurmi, 5.6% Teli, 4.5% Kanu, 4.5% Tharu, 3.8% Chamar/Harijan/Ram, 3.3% Kalwar, 2.9% Dusadh/Paswan/Pasi, 2.9% Mallaha, 2.6% Hill Brahmin, 2.4% Koiri/Kushwaha, 2.4% Tatma/Tatwa, 2.0% Dhobi, 2.0% Kathabaniyan, 2.0% Lohar, 1.8% Kumhar, 1.8% Tamang, 1.6% Nuniya, 1.5% Bin, 1.4% Terai Brahmin, 1.4% Hajam/Thakur, 1.3% Chhetri, 1.1% Musahar, 1.1% Sonar, 0.7% Magar, 0.6% Rajput, 0.5% Baraee, 0.5% Sanyasi/Dasnami, 0.4% Danuwar, 0.4% Kahar, 0.4% Kayastha, 0.4% Majhi, 0.4% Newar, 0.4% Sudhi, 0.3% Dhanuk, 0.3% Kami, 0.3% Mali, 0.3% Rai, 0.3% other Terai, 0.2% Damai/Dholi, 0.2% Dhunia, 0.2% Gaderi/Bhedihar, 0.1% Badhaee, 0.1% Bengali, 0.1% other Dalit, 0.1% Dom, 0.1% foreigners, 0.1% Gharti/Bhujel, 0.1% Gurung, 0.1% Halkhor, 0.1% Kumal, 0.1% Marwadi, 0.1% Pahari, 0.1% Sunuwar, 0.1% Thakuri, 0.1% Yakkha and 0.1% others.

In terms of religion, 77.8% were Hindu, 19.7% Muslim, 1.8% Buddhist, 0.2% Christian, 0.2% Prakriti, 0.1% Kirati and 0.3% others.

In terms of literacy, 41.6% could read and write, 3.7% could only read and 54.4% could neither read nor write.

Administration 
The district consists of twenty municipalities, out of which eighteen are urban municipalities and two are rural municipalities. These are as follows:

 Baudhimai Municipality
 Brindaban Municipality
 Chandrapur Municipality
 Dewahi Gonahi Municipality
 Gadhimai Municipality, Nepal
 Garuda Municipality
 Gaur Municipality
 Gujara Municipality
 Ishanath Municipality
 Katahariya Municipality
 Madhav Narayan Municipality
 Maulapur Municipality
 Paroha Municipality
 Phatuwa Bijayapur Municipality
 Rajdevi Municipality
 Rajpur Municipality
 Durga Bhagwati Rural Municipality
 Yamunamai Rural Municipality

Former Village Development Committees (VDCs) and Municipalities 

Ajagaibi
Akolawa
Auraiya
Badaharwa
Bagahi
Bahuwa Madanpur
Bairiya
Banjaraha
Bariyarpur
Basantapatti
Basatpur
Basbiti Jingadiya
Baudhimai
Bhalohiya
Bhediyahi
Birtiprastoka
Bishrampur
Bisunpurwa Manpur
Brahmapuri
Chandrapur Municipality
Debahi
Dharampur
Dharhari
Dipahi
Dumariya Bazar,Matiaon
Gadhi
Gamhariya Birta
Gamhariya Parsa
Gangapipra
Garuda Municipality
Gaur Municipality
Gedahiguthi
Gunahi
Hajminiya
Hardiya Paltuwa
Harsaha
Hathiyahi
Inarbari Jyutahi
Inaruwa
Jatahare
Jayanagar
Jethrahiya
Jhunkhunwa
Jingadawa Belbichhwa
Jingadiya
Jowaha
Judibela
Kanakpur
Karkach Karmaiya
Karuniya
Katahariya
Khesarhiya
Laksminiya
Laksmipur
Laksmipur Belbichhawa
Lokaha
Madanpur
Malahi
Maryadpur
Masedawa
Mathiya
Matsari
Mithuawa
Mudwalawa
Narkatiya Guthi
Pacharukhi
Patahi
Pataura
Pathara Budharampur
Paurai
Phatuha Maheshpur
Phatuha Harsaha
Pipariya
Pipra Bhagwanpur
Pipra Pokhariya
Pipra Rajbara
Pothiyahi
Pratappur Paltuwa
Prempur Gunahi
Purainawma
Raghunathpur
Rajdevi
Rajpur Pharhadawa
Rajpur Tulsi
Ramauli Bairiya
Rampur Khap
Rangapur
Sakhuwa
Sakhuwa Dhamaura
Samanpur
Sangrampur
Santapur
Santpur
Sarmujawa
Saruatha
Saunaraniya
Sawagada
Shitalpur Bairgania
Simara Bhawanipur
Sirsiya
Tejapakar
Tengraha
Tikuliya

Education 
Private Schools:
Bal Niketan Higher Secondary School, Chandrapur, Rautahat
Moonlight Academy, Chandranigahpur, Rautahat
Pathibhara Secondary School, Chandranigahpur, Rautahat
Mount Everest English School, Chandrapur, Rautahat
Namuna English Boarding School, Cha.pur Bazaar, Nepal police school, basbiti jigadiya rautahat,Himalayan Public School Sukdev Chowk

Shree Juddha Campus 
The origin of this campus goes back to its former "Shree Juddha Higher Secondary School" and further "Shree Juddha Secondary School", the third-oldest school in Nepal inaugurated by Juddha Shamsher Jang Bahadur Rana during Rana dynasty. The school got its name from his name. The institution has about 1500 students.

Shree Juddha Campus offers bachelor courses like Bachelor of Education, Bachelor of Arts, Bachelor of Commerce, etc. while its former entities "Shree Juddha Higher Secondary School" offers 10+2 courses of National Examinations Board and "Shree Juddha Secondary School" offers up to 10th class of School Leaving Certificate (Nepal).

It runs a separate school for blind students.

Gauri Shankar Yadav Campus 
It offers bachelor courses like B.Ed. and 10+2 courses of National Examinations Board.

Notable people 

 Madhav Kumar Nepal, chairman of CPN (Unified Socialist) and former Prime Minister of Nepal
 Anil Kumar Jha, senior leader of DSP, N, former Minister of Industry and Member of House of Representatives
 Banshidhar Mishra, leader of CPN (Unified Socialist), former parliantrian and former  Ambassador of Nepal to Bangladesh
 Sunil Kumar Yadav, Nepali Congress leader and member of Constituent Assembly
 Mohammad Aftab Alam, Nepali Congress leader and Member of House of Representatives

References

 
Districts of Nepal established during Rana regime or before
Districts of Madhesh Province